Yahya Hassan (19 May 1995 – 29 April 2020) was a Danish poet and political activist of Palestinian descent, whose poems and public statements criticizing both Islam and Danish policies on migration and participation in armed conflicts made him a much-debated and controversial figure.

His most notable work, Yahya Hassan, as of 2013 was the best-selling debut poetry collection in Denmark, and has been printed in more than 120,000 copies (middle of 2015).

Early life 
Yahya Hassan was born to a family of Muslim Palestinian immigrants, who had fled to Lebanon due to the Israeli occupation of Palestine,  and who moved to  Denmark in the 1980s. 
He was born in Aarhus V, a problematic immigrant district of the city of Aarhus, the second largest city in Denmark and the country's main port. He had four siblings, and his father frequently physically abused him. Hassan grew up in a religious environment, but soon abandoned religion. 
He was institutionalized for juvenile delinquency in Solhaven  in Farsø, where educators first supported his literary talent. 
At 16, Hassan had an affair with 38-year-old educator Louise Østergaard, which led to Østergaard's dismissal and divorce.
Hassan attended a "Rap Academy" and various workshops for creative writing.

Publications and reception
He published a first volume with Brønderslev Forfatterskole Et godt sted at dø ("a good place to die") in 2011, but became widely known in Denmark with his first volume published with the reputable Gyldendal publishing house, in 2013.

Literary scholar Tue Andersen Nexø described Hassan's longer works as "almost Walt Whitman-like." 
The volume was a best-seller and received favourable criticism, and his readings (done in an idiosyncratic style) were well-attended.

The poems are concerned with his upbringing in the "ghetto" of  Aarhus V, with attacks on his parents' generation  and on Islam. 
This has resulted in criticism and death threats  on the part of Danish Muslims, and Hassan was placed under police protection. 
Odense city library cancelled a planned reading due to the threat of attacks.
The cancellation led to a parliamentary debate in the Folketing, on Islamist threats impinging on the freedom of speech in Denmark.

Also in November 2013, Hassan was assaulted and injured by another Danish citizen of Palestinian descent, one Isaac Meyer, born Abdul Basit Abu-Lifa, who had a previous conviction for terrorism. Meyer had received a seven-year sentence in the 2005 Glostrup Terrorists Case, but had been released on parole in 2010.
The attacker was convicted for assault.

The poetry collection Yahya Hassan 2 was published on 8 November 2019, again to general critical acclaim.

Politics 
On 7 April 2015, Hassan announced that he had joined the newly formed Danish political party, Nationalpartiet. On 9 February 2016, the party's leader, Kashif Ahmad, announced that Hassan was forced to leave the party, after being arrested for driving under the influence of illegal drugs.

Death
Hassan was found dead in his apartment in Aarhus on 29 April 2020. The police do not believe the death to be a criminal act. Yahya Hassan converted back to Islam prior to his death.

Bibliography 
 Et godt sted at dø ("a good place to die"), Brønderslev Forfatterskole, 2011, 
 Yahya Hassan : Digte, Gyldendal, 2013, 
Yahya Hassan 2, Gyldendal, 2019,

References

External links 
 Poems of Rage. A video interview with Yahya Hassan Video by Louisiana Channel
 Three Poems by Yahya Hassan English Translations on Action Books

1995 births
2020 deaths
21st-century Danish male writers
21st-century Danish poets
Danish male poets
Danish people of Palestinian descent
Former Muslim critics of Islam
Former Muslims turned agnostics or atheists
Danish critics of Islam
People from Aarhus